Eden Cheng (born 2 December 2002) is an English elite diver representing Great Britain and England. She won her first major medal in 2018 at the age of 15, when she won the gold medal at the European Championships in the 10 metre platform synchro with Lois Toulson.

Early life
Cheng was born in London in 2002 to Chinese immigrants. She studied at Alleyn's School in Dulwich, London. She previously went to Streatham and Clapham Junior School. She took up diving after being inspired during the 2012 London Olympics. She joined Crystal Palace Diving where she trains under Chen Lin.

In 2022, Cheng moved to California and dives with the UCLA women's diving team.

Career 
Cheng started competing as a junior in 2013 and was a National champion a number of times. Cheng competed at National Age Group Championships, and won the 3m Springboard event in 2016.

In 2017, she competed at her first British Junior Elite Championships and won gold. The same year Cheng made her debut in a European championship, representing Great Britain at the Junior European Diving Championships in Bergen, where she won a gold medal. She started competing as a senior in a number of FINA Grand Prix events in 2017, one of the youngest divers chosen for these events. She won a silver in the Mixed 10m platform event with Kyle Kothari, as well as a bronze in the 10m Synchro event with Emily Martin in Singapore.

2018–2019
In her first senior competition at the 2018 European Championships in Glasgow/Edinburgh, she partnered with Lois Toulson in the women's 10 metre synchro platform, and at the age of 15 she won her first senior international gold medal.

Cheng took part in her first World Championship at the 2019 World Aquatics Championships held in Gwangju, South Korea. Cheng finished in sixth in the 10 metre synchro with Toulson, as well as the team event with Ross Haslam. At the 2019 European Diving Championships held in Kyiv, Cheng won silver in the Mixed 10 m platform synchro with Noah Williams and bronze in the team event.

2021
At the 2021 FINA Diving World Cup held in Japan as an official test event for the 2020 Tokyo Olympics, Cheng and Toulson won silver in synchronised 10m platform, thereby securing their qualification to the Olympics. The pair also won silver in synchronised 10m platform at the European Championships. At the 2020 Olympics, the pair finished seventh in the synchronized 10 metre platform after a poor start.

Career highlights

References

External links
 
 
 
 

2002 births
Living people
British female divers
Olympic divers of Great Britain
Divers at the 2020 Summer Olympics
Sportspeople from London
Commonwealth Games medallists in diving
Commonwealth Games silver medallists for England
Divers at the 2022 Commonwealth Games
Medallists at the 2022 Commonwealth Games